Absolutely Fabulous: 20th Anniversary (also known as Ab Fab at 20) is a set of three special episodes of the British television sitcom Absolutely Fabulous. It was broadcast on BBC One between 25 December 2011 and 23 July 2012 to commemorate the 20th anniversary of the series, which debuted in 1992.

Cast and characters

Main
 Jennifer Saunders as Edina Monsoon
 Joanna Lumley as Patsy Stone
 Julia Sawalha as Saffron Monsoon
 Jane Horrocks as Bubble
 June Whitfield as Mother

Guest

 Christopher Malcolm as Justin
 Lucy Montgomery as Baron
 Naoko Mori as Sarah
 Sofie Gråbøl as Sarah Lund
 Llewella Gideon as beautician
 Harriet Thorpe as Fleur
 Helen Lederer as Catriona
 Rose Johnson as Patsy's intern
 Camille Ucan as Bubble's intern
 Hannah Dodd as Saffy's do gooder
 Femi Oyeniran as agent
 Amy Yamazaki as agent
 Patricia Potter as Royal Albert Hall manager
 Richard Sisson as pianist
 Mo Gaffney as Bo
 Christopher Ryan as Marshall
 Eleanor Thom as Olympic party hostess
 Beattie Edmondson as Olympic party waitress
 James O'Driscoll as blind paralympian

Special guests

 La Roux as herself
 Emma Bunton as herself
 Lulu as herself
 Kirsty Wark as herself
 Mark Kermode as himself
 Lindsay Duncan as Jeanne Durand
 Kelly Holmes as herself
 Tanni Grey Thompson as herself
 Stella McCartney as herself

Episodes

Reception

Ratings

Critical reception
Michael Hogan of The Daily Telegraph gave the specials a negative review; following the "Olympics" episode, he commented, "The special Olympic edition of Absolutely Fabulous [...] would have won no medals for comedy." He added, "This was the last of three 20th anniversary specials, the first pair of which were shown over Christmas. Every single one of those 20 years showed on-screen during this torturous half-hour."

In a more favourable review, Meredith Blake of The A.V. Club stated, "While longtime AbFab fans will enjoy this latest incarnation of the series, which has been reprised multiple times since its official end in 1995, 'Identity' most definitely isn't for AbFab neophytes, who will most likely be confused by the broad performances, the outré costumes, and the disembodied canned laughter."

Accolades
In 2012, Jennifer Saunders received the BAFTA TV Award for Best Female Comedy Performance for her portrayal as Edina Monsoon following the first two specials.

Home media
The 20th Anniversary specials have been released on DVD, first in the United Kingdom on 30 July 2012, and then in Australia on 16 August 2012, and in the United States on 11 September 2012. 

Additionally, the specials are available as part of complete collection sets including "Absolutely Fabulous: Absolutely All of It!", released 5 November 2013 in the United States, and "Absolutely Fabulous: Absolutely Everything − The Definitive Edition", released in both the United Kingdom, on 17 March 2014, and in Australia on 30 April 2014.

References

External links
 
 
 

20th Anniversary